Kadhalil Vizhunthen is a 2008 Indian Tamil-language romantic psychological thriller film written and directed by P. V. Prasath starring Nakul and Sunaina. The film has music by Vijay Antony, cinematography by S.D. Vijay Milton and editing by V. T. Vijayan. The shooting for the film started in August 2007, and the film was released in September 2008.

The song "Nakka Mukka", a kuthu (folk) song and "Thozhiya", a melodious romantic song, were very successful hits composed were one of the main reasons for the film's success. All songs in this movie was composed by Vijay Antony except "Unakena Naan". It was composed by this movie Director PV Prasath itself. "Nakka Mukka" was played in the opening ceremony of the Cricket World Cup 2011 held at Mirpur, Bangladesh. It also featured among a medley of Tamil songs performed by Shah Rukh Khan and Shriya Saran in the inaugural of the fourth edition of the Indian Premier League 2011 held in Chennai, India.

Plot
The story focuses on the life of Sabhapathy. He is the football-crazy son of an alcoholic and lives in the slums. However, he lives a comfortable life and plays football with his mates as he completes his college career. He meets Meera and develops a liking for her. He slowly starts to love her but is afraid to express his love since she is rich and would react hastily. However, he later does confirm his love to her, and she accepts. When Sabha leaves for a football match with his college, he promises he will propose to her as soon as he gets back. Sabha returns from his match to only find out that Meera has died. Sabhapathy slips into a psychotic depression, travelling with Meera's dead body. This peculiar behaviour of Sabapathy who thinks Meera is alive is validated. A doctor shows the inspector a wildlife documentary in which a monkey continues to nurse it's dead offspring . The doctor further attributes this behaviour unconditional love which to some people makes people ignore reality and live in the past. This documentary forms the crux of the entire movie. To make matters even worse, the police are after Sabhapathy. The climax of the movie shows Sabhapathy commits suicide after killing Meera's uncle Kasirajan, who murdered her in order to gain her wealth. The film ends with Sabhapathy and Meera's souls are united and the two lovers will never be separated, even in death.

Cast
 Nakul as Sabhapathy: Meera’s boyfriend
 Sunaina as Meera: Kasirajan’s niece, Sabhapathy’s girlfriend
 Sampath Raj as Inspector Anbu Selvan
 Livingston as Traveling Ticket Examiner
 Hari Raj as Kasirajan, Meera's uncle
 Chaams as Meera's friend
Pasi Sathya as Sabhapathi's neighbour
 Nalinikanth as Doctor
 Sridhar in a special appearance in the song "Naaka Mukka"

Production
Nakul, who was one of the heroes in Boys made his comeback through this film and he has reduced over 20 kilograms to play the lead role in the film. A stunt sequence was shot in Mettupalayam and Nakul performed it without any dupe. The film was shot at locations in Chennai, Ooty, Thalakkonam, Mudumalai, Pollachi, Valparai, Masinagudi, Gudalar, Udumalpet, Coimbatore and Kodaikanal. The film marked the foray of the Sun Network into film distribution through their newly founded production company Sun Pictures.

Soundtrack

The soundtrack has nine tracks, which were composed by Vijay Antony, except one track - “Unakkena Naan” which was done by P.V.Prasath, the director himself. The lyrics were written by Thamarai, P.V.Prasath, Nepolian and Priyan. The song "Nakka Mukka" met with a tremendous response from the youth and was on everyone's lips. It was played in the opening ceremony of the Cricket World Cup 2011 held at Mirpur, Bangladesh. It also featured among a medley of Tamil songs performed by Shah Rukh Khan and Shriya Saran in the inaugural of the fourth edition of the Indian Premier League 2011 held at Chennai, India. The soundtrack met with critical acclaim and made Vijay Antony popular among the Tamil audience. Following the internet phenomenon of "Why This Kolaveri Di" in 2011, "Naaka Mukka" was featured alongside "Oh Podu", "Appadi podu" and "Ringa Ringa" in a small collection of south Indian songs that are considered a "national rage" in India. The song "Naaka Mukka" would eventually go on to be featured in the Telugu-language film, Mahatma, and the Bollywood film, The Dirty Picture. "Unakkena Naan" is based on Rihanna's "Unfaithful".

Release
The film was lying in the cans for one year and Sun Pictures bought the film making it their first film. The film opened alongside Sakkarakatti at the box office on 26 September 2008 with the media hyping that it was a battle of two films with debutants and successful soundtracks.

The success of the film led Nakul and Sunaina reunite again in Maasilamani which too was promoted by Sun Pictures and became successful. PV Prasad started another project "Eppadi Manasukkul Vanthai" for he was held in cheating case and the film was finally released in 2012.

Critical reception
Rediff wrote: "Kadhalil Vizhundhen achieves at least in part, what other love-stories fail to do -- to bring a genuine lump in your throat at times". IndiaGlitz praised the director writing, "with a lesser known star cast, director Prasad has managed to weave a sequence of some interesting and catchy sequences...the end product, through gory and violent, leaves an impact with the audience." Behindwoods said overall the movie "deals with a regular theme in a refreshing manner", and the director of the film "understood perfectly the requirements of the script" and "has taken quite a few cinematic liberties but has handled all of them well which keep boredom or ridicule well at bay".

References

External links
 

2008 films
2008 action thriller films
2000s romantic thriller films
2000s Tamil-language films
Films scored by Vijay Antony
Indian action thriller films
Indian romantic thriller films
Tamil films remade in other languages
2008 directorial debut films